Gauri  is a 1943 Indian Bollywood film. It was the seventh highest grossing Indian film of 1943. Monica Desai, Prithviraj Kapoor, Shamim Bano and Raj Kapoor played the lead roles in the film.

References

External links
 

1943 films
1940s Hindi-language films
Indian black-and-white films